The Paso Robles Press began in June 1889, and has published continually since. The publication is currently a weekly printed newspaper and daily online publication based in Paso Robles, California, United States that serves the residents of northern San Luis Obispo County. It is operated by 13 Stars Media, with a readership primarily in Paso Robles and surrounding communities, including Templeton, San Miguel and Shandon.

In September 2019, News Media, Inc. sold ownership of the Paso Robles Press, along with the Atascadero News, Morro Bay Life, Avila Beach Life, Central Coast Ranch Life+Equine Enthusiast™, and Central Coast TRVLR+Vino™ to 13 Stars Media, owned by Hayley Mattson. At the time, 13 Stars Media published two monthly magazines — Paso Robles Magazine and Atascadero News Magazine.

The official headquarters moved downtown Atascadero in September 2019, to 5860 El Camino Real above the former Atascadero Market, a few doors down from the former Atascadero News location at 5660 El Camino Real location where it had spent more than 60 years (1949-2013).

References

Atascadero, California
Weekly newspapers published in California
Mass media in San Luis Obispo County, California